Richmond Hill is a historic home and farm complex located at Livingston in Columbia County, New York.

History
Richmond Hill was built in 1814 for Walter Livingston.  The estate includes a large Federal style residence dating to 1813–1814, ten contributing related outbuildings, and one contributing structure.  The main house is a two-story, rectangular brick block with a gable roof and slightly protruding three bay pavilion.  Also on the property is a large Dutch barn, two smaller barns, carriage house, privy, shop, shed, and well.

It was added to the National Register of Historic Places in 1988.

Gallery

References

External links

Houses on the National Register of Historic Places in New York (state)
Farms on the National Register of Historic Places in New York (state)
Federal architecture in New York (state)
Houses completed in 1790
Houses in Columbia County, New York
National Register of Historic Places in Columbia County, New York